The 2008–09 Vodafone A1GP Algarve, Portugal was an A1 Grand Prix race held at Autódromo Internacional do Algarve, Portugal.

Drivers

Qualifying 

† Team utilized Powerboost lap.

Sprint Race 

† Switzerland assessed penalty for pitting outside of pit-stop window.

Feature Race 
The second pit-stop window was set as Laps 26–34.

† – Ireland were given a 25-second penalty post-race for passing Australia under the safety car.

Notes 
 It was the 38th race weekend (76 starts).
 It was the 2nd race in Portugal and the first at the Autódromo Internacional do Algarve.
 It was the first race as main driver for  Vitantonio Liuzzi and  André Lotterer.
 It was the first race weekend as rookie driver for  Vitantonio Liuzzi,  André Lotterer and  Robbie Pecorari.
 A1 Team Italy and  Vitantonio Liuzzi achieved their first pole position.
  Robert Doornbos achieved his first Sprint Race victory.
  Neel Jani's win in the Feature Race was his tenth career victory, surpassing Nico Hülkenberg's record.

References

External links 
 Doornbos' Dutch delight
 Sprint race: lap-by-lap
 Sprint race results
 Switzerland's fun in the sun
 Feature race results

A1 Grand Prix Of Nations, Portugal, 2008-09
A1 Grand Prix